Platygramme is a genus of lichenized fungi in the family Graphidaceae consisting of about 30 species. The genus was circumscribed by Antoine Laurent Apollinaire Fée in 1874.

Species
, Species Fungorum (as listed in the Catalogue of Life) accepts 27 species of Platygramme.
 Platygramme arechavaletae 
 Platygramme australiensis 
 Platygramme coccinea 
 Platygramme colubrosa 
 Platygramme commutabilis 
 Platygramme computata 
 Platygramme discurrens 
 Platygramme elaeoplaca 
 Platygramme elegantula 
 Platygramme fuscescens  – Australia
 Platygramme hainanensis  – China
 Platygramme impudica 
 Platygramme kaalensis 
 Platygramme lueckingii  – China
 Platygramme microspora 
 Platygramme muelleri 
 Platygramme pachyspora 
 Platygramme pachnodes 
 Platygramme platyloma 
 Platygramme praestans 
 Platygramme pseudomontagnei 
 Platygramme pudica 
 Platygramme subarechavaletae  – Thailand
 Platygramme subcolubrosa  – Thailand
 Platygramme taiwanensis 
 Platygramme tumulata 
 Platygramme unirana  – Brazil
 Platygramme wattiana

References

Graphidaceae
Lichen genera
Ostropales genera
Taxa named by Antoine Laurent Apollinaire Fée
Taxa described in 1874